Ilhan Kyuchyuk (born 16 September 1985) is a politician from the Movement for Rights and Freedoms (MRF). and Co-President of the Alliance of Liberals and Democrats for Europe (ALDE). He is a Member of the European Parliament for a second term from the Renew Europe group.

Biography, education and early years
Kyuchyuk was born on 16 September 1985 in Sevlievo, Bulgaria. His mother is a nurse and his father works as an electrician. Ilhan Kyuchyuk completed his secondary education in Sevlievo. He holds a Bachelor's degree in Political Science and Management from the ‘St. Cyril and St. Methodius’ University of Veliko Turnovo (2004-2008) and a master's degree in Law from the same university (2005-2010). During the years, he has had the opportunity to participate in various trainings and specializations such as Public policies academy (Prague, Czech Republic), International Academy for Leadership (Gummersbach, Germany), US State Department program on European economic, social and political issues, Rossotrudnichestvo program on Foreign Affairs (Moscow, Russia). In 2012 he graduated from the Bulgarian School of Politics ‘Dimitar Panitza’ and participated in the World Forum for Democracy in Strasbourg, France. In 2014 Mr. Kyuchyuk specialized in École nationale d'administration in France (ENA).

Personal life 
Ilhan Kyuchyuk is married and has one child.

Professional and political career 
Ilhan Kyuchyuk has been a member of the Youth MRF since 2005, and over the years was involved in various activities within the organization. In the period 2009-2012 he served as member of the Central Operational Council of the Youth MRF with a portfolio of Internal Policy, Media Policy and PR. At the VIth National Conference, held in November 2012, he was elected Chairman of the Youth MRF, and in April 2016, during the VIIth National Conference, was re-elected Chairman of the organization.  Mr. Kyuchyuk was Chairman of the Youth MRF in the period 2012-2020. In 2010 he became a Member of the Executive Council of the National Youth Forum Bulgaria, and in 2011 he was elected its Deputy Chairman.
In 2014, Ilhan Kyuchyuk was elected Member of the European Parliament in the parliamentary group of the Alliance of Liberals and Democrats for Europe (ALDE). In the elections held on 26 May 2019, he was elected for a new five-year term as a Member of the European Parliament from the Movement for Rights and Freedoms list. 
He is a Member of the Committee on Foreign Affairs (AFET), a Substitute Member of the Committee on Transport and Tourism (TRAN), and the Committee on Legal Affairs (JURI). Ilhan Kyuchyuk is the first Vice Chair of the Delegation to the EU-Turkey Joint Parliamentary Committee and Substitute Member of the Delegation for relations with the Arab Peninsula.
From November 2014 until November 2017, he was a Member of the Liberal International Human Rights Committee. In December 2017, Kyuchyuk was elected Vice President of the ALDE party, and in October 2019 he was re-elected with the highest score among all candidates.  
On 11 June 2021, Ilhan Kyuchyuk was elected Co-President of the ALDE Party. 
Recognizing his hard work in the EP's Committee on Foreign Affairs, he was appointed a member of the EP delegation to the Conference on the Future of Europe, responsible for the "EU in the World" priority topic.   
Ilhan Kyuchyuk is the Permanent Rapporteur on the European Parliament reports on North Macedonia, Uzbekistan, Andorra, Monaco and San Marino.

Awards and distinctions 
In October 2017, Kyuchyuk was awarded the honorary sign of the municipality of Sevlievo for his active public activity among young people in the municipality. 
In March 2018 he received the ‘MEP of the Year’ award in the ‘Culture and Media’ category. 
In July 2019, MEP Ilhan Kyuchyuk was awarded the Order of Honour of the National Assembly of the Republic of Azerbaijan (Milli Mejlis), and in November 2019 he was awarded the Order of Honour of the Ministry of Foreign Affairs of the Republic of Azerbaijan (Centenary Medal). Kyuchyuk received the awards for his active work in the promotion and development of bilateral relations between the Republic of Azerbaijan and the Republic of Bulgaria.
In January 2020 he was awarded by the Council of Moroccans around the world for the promotion of Moroccan culture in Bulgaria and the promotion of bilateral relations between the European Union and the Kingdom of Morocco. 

In September 2022, Ilhan Kyuchyuk was awarded the honorary title "Doctor Honoris Causa" by the American University in Europe-FON. The honorary title was awarded for his special contribution to the development of scientific and educational cooperation, as well as for the convergence and promotion of European values and culture in higher education.

References

External links
„Балансиращата роля на ЕС в Централна Азия”, автори Илхан Кючюк, Валентин Тончев, в-к „24 часа”, 4 December 2020 г. 

The current momentum for EU – Uzbekistan relations is very positive by Ilhan Kyuchyuk, Diplomatic World Uzbekistan, pp. 36-37

„Изборите в Северна Македония: Решаващ тест за демократична зрялост”, автор Илхан Кючюк, в-к „24 часа”, 30 June 2020 г. 

„Как да осигурим европейско бъдеще за Западните Балкани”, автор Илхан Кючюк, в-к „24 часа”, 16 March 2020 г.

EU enlargement needs better strategic communication, by Ilhan Kyuchyuk, Euractiv.com, 12 March 2020

Migration can only be tackled by the EU as a whole, by Ilhan Kyuchyuk, Euractiv.com, 20 July 2018

A year of opportunity for the Balkans, by Ilhan Kyuchyuk, Euractiv.com, 18 April 2018

„Бъдещето на ЕС след Брекзит”, автор Илхан Кючюк, в-к „Стандарт”, 4 October 2017 г.

The strongest candidate from Eastern Europe for UN top job is a woman, by Ilhan Kyuchyuk, Euractiv.com, 1 September 2016

„Преговорите за остров Кипър или последният шанс за обединение”, автор Илхан Кючюк, в-к „24 часа”, 28 June 2017 г.

„Истинската причина защо британците трябва да гласуват за оставане в ЕС”, автор Илхан Кючюк, в-к „24 часа”, 20 June 2016 г.

„Великобритания без ЕС е просто Британия”, автор Илхан Кючюк, в-к „Стандарт”, 11 April 2016 г.

Ilhan Kyuchyuk: The Bulgarian MEP devastated by Brexit, Politico, 27 September 2016

„Либерални възможности пред европейския кръстопът”, автор Илхан Кючюк, Ilhankyuchyuk.eu, 9 May 2015 г.

1985 births
Living people
Bulgarian Muslims
MEPs for Bulgaria 2014–2019
Movement for Rights and Freedoms MEPs
Bulgarian people of Turkish descent
People from Sevlievo
MEPs for Bulgaria 2019–2024